
This is a list of aircraft in alphabetical order beginning with 'Th'.

Th

Thaden 
( (Herbert von) Thaden Metal Aircraft Co, Oakland Airport and San Francisco, CA)
 Thaden T-1 a.k.a. Argonaut
 Thaden T-2
 Thaden T-4

Thalman 
(Harry J Thalman, Salt Lake City, UT)
 Thalman T-1 a.k.a. Argonaut
 Thalman T-3B<ref name=popsci0746>{{cite journal |journal=Popular Science |date=July 1946 |page=81 |url=https://books.google.com/books?id=TCEDAAAAMBAJ&dq=popular+science+1930&pg=PA81|title= Whats new in Aviation |accessdate=11 May 2013}}</ref>
 Thalman T-4

 Thatcher 
 Thatcher CX4
 Thatcher CX5

 Thalerhof 
 Thalerhof U 12

The Airplane Factory
The Airplane Factory, Pty, Ltd, Tedderfield Airpark, Eikenhof, Johannesburg South, South Africa
The Airplane Factory Sling 2
The Airplane Factory Sling 4
The Airplane Factory Sling TSi

 The Butterfly 
(The Butterfly Aircraft LLC)
 The Butterfly Super Sky Cycle
 The Butterfly Aurora
 The Butterfly Emperor
 The Butterfly Ultralight
 The Butterfly Golden
 The Butterfly Golden Monarch
 The Butterfly Turbo Golden

Theiss Aviation
(Salem, Ohio, United States)
Theiss Speedster
Theiss Sportster
Theiss Ferret
Theiss NIRV
Theiss Super Ferret
Theiss Tarzan
Theiss TIC

 THK 
(Türk Hava Kurumu - Turkish Air League)
 THK-01 - Wedrychowski, J. & Duleba, Leszka & Rrogalski, Stanisław & Teisseyre, Jerzy - Türk Hava Kurumu THK-2
 THK-03 - Jacobs, Hans & DFS - (DFS Habicht)
 THK-04 - SSCB - Türk Hava Kurumu (АНТОНОВ УС-4 (Antonov US-4))
 THK-5
 THK-5A
 THK-07 - Antonov, Oleg Konstantinovich & SSBC - Türk Hava Kurumu (Antonov PS-2)
 THK-09 - Schawrow, W. B. & SSCB - Türk Hava Kurumu
 THK-10
 THK-11
 THK-12
 THK-13
 THK-14
 THK-15
 THK-16 Mehmetçik (Turkish: "Little Mehmet"[1])
 THK-TAYSU (Tarimsal Havacilik ve Yangin Söndürme Uçagi)

 Thomas-Morse 
(Thomas-(Frank L) Morse (Morse Chain Co) Aircraft Corp, Ithaca, NY)
 Thomas 1910 Biplane
 Thomas 1911 Biplane
 Thomas 1912 Biplane
 Thomas 1913 Monoplane
 Thomas 1913 Biplane
 Thomas 1913 Biplane
 Thomas 1913 Biplane
 Thomas Brothers BP
 Thomas Brothers B-3
 Thomas Brothers B-4
 Thomas Brothers D-2
 Thomas Brothers D-5
 Thomas Brothers E
 Thomas Brothers HS
 Thomas Brothers S-4
 Thomas Brothers S-5
 Thomas Brothers S-6
 Thomas Brothers S-7
 Thomas Brothers S-9
 Thomas Brothers SH-4
 Thomas Brothers T-2
 Thomas-Morse MB-1
 Thomas-Morse MB-2
 Thomas-Morse MB-3
 Thomas-Morse MB-4
 Thomas-Morse MB-6
 Thomas-Morse MB-7
 Thomas-Morse MB-9
 Thomas-Morse MB-10
 Thomas-Morse TA
 Thomas-Morse TA Tractor
 Thomas-Morse TA Hydro
 Thomas-Morse TM-22
 Thomas-Morse TM-23
 Thomas-Morse TM-24
 Thomas-Morse O-6
 Thomas-Morse O-19
 Thomas-Morse O-20
 Thomas-Morse O-21
 Thomas-Morse O-23
 Thomas-Morse O-33
 Thomas-Morse O-41
 Thomas-Morse O-42
 Thomas-Morse P-13 Viper
 Thomas-Morse R-2
 Thomas-Morse R-5

 Thomas 
(Walter J Thomas, Chicago, IL)
 Thomas A-1 Sport
 Thomas A-2 Sport

 Thomas 
(M A Thomas, Pasadena, CA)
 Thomas MT-1

 Thompson 
(De Lloyd Thompson, Cicero, IL, built by Charles H Day at Griffith Park, Los Angeles, CA)
 Thompson 1914 Biplane a.k.a. Thompson-Day

 Thompson 
(Milford H Thompson, Eagle Grove, IA)
 Thompson 1928 Monoplane
 Thompson Midget

 Thompson 
((R Lavin) Thompson Aircraft Co, Los Angeles, CA)
 Thompson M-1

 Thompson 
(Paul R Thompson, Independence, MO)
 Thompson T-4875

 Thompson 
(Earl O Thompson, Marshalltown, IA)
 Thompson Sportplane

 Thompson 
(B B Thompson, Belle, WV)
 Thompson BBT-2

 Thompson 
(Carl Thompson, Wakefield, MA)
 Thompson 1949 Monoplane
 Thompson Mighty Mite
 Thompson Poncho

 Thompson 
(W Z Thompson, Harrodsburg, KY)
 Thompson 1956 Monoplane

 Thompson 
((Richard) Thompson Aircraft Co, Philadelphia, PA)
 Thompson Boxmoth

 Thompson-Balbone 
(Ralph & Harry Thompson)
 Thompson-Balbone Special

 Thor 
(Thor-Air Inc.)
 Thor T/A
 Thor T-1
 Thor T-1A
 Thor T-2
 Thor Juno

 Thorp 
(Thorp Aircraft Co, Pacoima, CA)Data from: Thorp T-1 - 1931 Design study of a two place light plane.
 Thorp T-2 - 1932 Design study.
 Thorp T-3 - 1933 Two/four-place, all-metal, retractable, built by Rudy Paulic.
 Thorp T-4 - 1934 Design study.
 Thorp T-5 - 1935 Tandem two-place trainer, built by Boeing School.
 Thorp T-6 - 1936 Modified T-5 with tricycle landing gear, built by Boeing School.
 Thorp T-7 - 1939 Design study of an all-wood airplane.
 Thorp T-8 - 1940 Design study.
 Thorp T-9 - 1941 Design study.
 Mod 33 1942 Lockheed Little Dipper single-place for flying infantryman.
 Mod 34 1943 Lockheed Big Dipper two-place single-engine pusher.
 Thorp T-10 - 1944 Series "I" Sky Skooter - Taildragger - proposed engine Franklin 2AC-99 50 hp.
 Thorp T-11 - 1945 Sky Skooter,  Lycoming O-145. FAR Part 23 certification.
 Thorp TL-1 - 1948 Design study - Liaison Aircraft.
 Thorp T-111 - 1953 Sky Skooter,  Lycoming O-145. FAR Part 23 certification.
 Thorp T-211 - 1963 Sky Skooter,  Continental O-200. FAR Part 23 certification.
 Thorp T-12 - 1945-50 Design study.
 Thorp T-13 - 1950 FL-23, high wing observation prototype built by Fletcher Aviation.
 Thorp T-14 - 1951 FD-25, "Defender" armed light plane,  Continental, by Fletcher Aviation.
 Thorp T-15 - 1952 FU-24, agricultural aircraft for Aerial Topdressing market, prototype built by Fletcher Aviation, large scale production in New Zealand.
 Thorp T-16 - 1956-58 180 hp, Piper Cherokee preliminary design.
 Thorp T-17 - 1958 Wing Derringer original design. Began as twin engine Skooter.
 Thorp T-18 Tiger - 1960 All-metal two-place, high-performance homebuilt.
Don Taylor's T-18 was first homebuilt to fly around the world.
Clive Canning flew his T-18 from Australia to England and return.
 Thorp T-19 - 1962 Design study - Four-place, twinjet aircraft using Williams Research engine.
 Thorp T-20 - 1971 Design study - Single-place, open-cockpit sport plane
 Thorp T-21 - 1971 Design study - Utility airplane.
 Thorp T-22 - 1972 Design study - Sport plane.
 Thorp T-23 - 1972 Design study - Single-place high-performance sport plane.
 Thorp SE5-F replica - Prototype built.
 Thorp T-28 - 1974 Design study - Two-place, twin-engine airplane based on the T-18.

 Thornton 
(Kenneth Montee, Santa Monica, CA)
 Thornton N-2 Special

 Thrush Aircraft 
 Thrush 400
 Thrush 510/550
 Thrush 660

 Thruster 
(Thruster Air Services, Langworth, Lincoln, England, United Kingdom)
Thruster T300
Thruster T600 Sprint
Thruster TST MK1

Thruster
(Thruster Aircraft (Australia) Pty. Ltd.)
Thruster TST

 Thunder Wing 
(Kenneth Montee, Santa Monica, CA)
 Thunder Wing Curtiss P-40C
 Thunder Wing Focke-Wulf Fw.190A 1/2 scale
 Thunder Wing Focke-Wulf Fw.190A 4/5 scale
 Thunder Wing Supermarine Spitfire Mk IX

 Thunderbird 
(Kenneth Montee, Santa Monica, CA)
 Thunderbird 1928 Monoplane
 Thunderbird W-14

 Thulin 
(AB Thulinverken)
 Thulin Type A
 Thulin Type B
 Thulin Type C
 Thulin Type D
 Thulin Type E
 Thulin Type FA
 Thulin Type G
 Thulin Type GA
 Thulin Type H
 Thulin Type K
 Thulin Type KA
 Thulin Type L
 Thulin Type LA
 Thulin Type M
 Thulin Type N
 Thulin Type NA

 Thurston 
( Thurston Aircraft Corp, Sanford, ME)
 Thurston HRV-1
 Thurston TA-16 Seafire
 Thurston TA16 Trojan
 Thurston TA-19 Seamaster
 Thurston Teal

 THvK (KIBM) 
(Turk Hava Kuvvetleri, Kayseri Hava Ikmal Bakim Merkezi Komutanligi'' - Turkish Air Force, Kayseri Air Supply and Maintenance Centre Command)
 KIBM Mavi Isik 78-XA
 KIBM Mavi Isik-B
 KIBM Mavi Isik-G

References

Further reading

External links 

 List of aircraft (T)